Berriman is a surname. Notable people with the surname include:

Fred Berriman (1879–1945), British politician
John Berriman (1691–1768), English clergyman and scholar, brother of William
William Berriman (1688–1750), English theologian

See also
Berryman (disambiguation)